Ceanothus purpureus, with the common name hollyleaf ceanothus, is a species of shrub in the family Rhamnaceae. It is endemic to northern California, where it is known only from the Inner North Coast Ranges north of the Bay Area, mainly in Sonoma and Napa Counties. The largest remaining population of this shrub occurs on Mt. George near Napa, where it is protected in a botanical preserve.

Description
The Ceanothus purpureus plant grows in woodland and chaparral habitat. It is spreading or erect in form, approaching 2 meters in maximum height. The woody parts are gray to reddish brown in color. The evergreen leaves are oppositely arranged and up to about 2.5 centimeters long. They are round to oval, wavy, and edged with spiny teeth, resembling the leaf of holly. The inflorescence is a small cluster of blue or purple flowers. The fruit is a horned capsule about half a centimeter long.

References

External links
Jepson Manual Treatment - Ceanothus purpureus
USDA Plants Profile: Ceanothus purpureus
Ceanothus purpureus - Photo gallery

purpureus
Endemic flora of California
Natural history of the California chaparral and woodlands
Natural history of the California Coast Ranges
Natural history of the San Francisco Bay Area
Plants described in 1901
Taxa named by Willis Linn Jepson